Sinotectirostrum is a genus of brachiopods found in Paleozoic strata.

Cherkesova (2007) reassigns two taxa, "radiata" and "omaliusi", that Nalivkin had placed in Camarotoechia, to Sinotectirostrum as a new combination for a species and a subspecies respectively.

References 

Prehistoric brachiopod genera
Silurian first appearances
Carboniferous extinctions
Rhynchonellida